Kilimanjaro is the second album by the American Jazz group The Rippingtons, released in 1988 for Passport Jazz Records, and later reissued under the GRP label. Kilimanjaro reached #3 on Billboard's Jazz chart.

Track listing and Personnel 
(All tracks composed by Russ Freeman except where noted).

 "Morocco" - 4:50
 Russ Freeman – electric guitar, guitar synthesizer, keyboards and programming
 Jimmy Johnson – fretless bass
 Vinnie Colaiuta – drums
 Tony Morales – additional cymbals
 Steve Reid – percussion
 Dave Koz – alto saxophone
 "Northern Lights" - 4:41
 Russ Freeman – classical and electric guitars, guitar synthesizer, keyboards and programming
 Jimmy Johnson – fretless bass
 Tony Morales – drums
 Steve Reid – percussion
 "Dream of the Sirens" - 5:38
 Russ Freeman – electric guitar, guitar synthesizer, keyboards, Linn 9000 drum programming
 David Garfield – synthesizer solo
 Bill Lanphier – fretless bass
 Tony Morales – cymbals
 Steve Reid – percussion
 "Katrina's Dance" - 5:59
 Russ Freeman – electric and acoustic guitars, guitar synthesizer, keyboards and programming
 Jimmy Haslip – bass
 Tony Morales – drums
 Steve Reid – percussion
 Brandon Fields – alto saxophone
 "Kilimanjaro" - 4:47
 Russ Freeman – electric guitar, guitar synthesizer, keyboards, Linn 9000 drum programming
 Brandon Fields – alto saxophone
 Steve Reid – percussion and soundscape
 "Back Stabbers" (Leon Huff / John Whitehead / Gene McFadden) - 4:08
 Russ Freeman – acoustic and electric guitars, keyboards
 David Garfield – additional keyboards
 Jimmy Johnson – electric bass
 Vinnie Colaiuta – drums
 Steve Reid – percussion
 Brandon Fields – alto saxophone
 "Love Notes" - 4:15
 Russ Freeman – electric guitar, guitar synthesizer, keyboards and programming
 David Garfield – acoustic piano solo
 Jimmy Haslip – bass
 Vinnie Colaiuta – drums
 Steve Reid – percussion
 Brandon Fields – alto and tenor saxophones
 "Los Cabos!" - 4:09
 Russ Freeman – electric guitar, guitar synthesizer, keyboards and programming
 David Garfield – acoustic piano solo
 Jimmy Johnson – electric bass
 Vinnie Coluaita – drums
 Steve Reid – percussion
 Brandon Fields – flute
 "Oceansong" - 5:30
 Russ Freeman – classical and electric guitars, guitar synthesizer, keyboards and programming
 Jimmy Johnson – fretless bass
 Bill Lanphier – bass
 Tony Morales – drums
 Steve Reid – percussion
 Brandon Fields – alto saxophone

Production 
 Russ Freeman – producer, arrangements, mixing 
 Dean Whitney – executive producer 
 Brad Gilderman – engineer, mixing
 Micajah Ryan – engineer
 Alan Hirschberg – additional engineer
 Bill Mayer – cover illustration 
 Murray Brenman – design 
 Ann Summa – back cover photography 
 Andi Howard and Associates – management

Charts

References

External links
The Rippingtons - Kilimanjaro at Discogs
The Rippingtons - Kilimanjaro at AllMusic
The Rippingtons Official Website

1988 albums
The Rippingtons albums
GRP Records albums